Boy Mondragon (born 1958) is a Filipino singer. He worked for Vicor Artists and was particularly successful on Filipino radio in the 1970s. He is best known for his hit Rain.

Awards

Discography
A House is Not a Home  - 1970
Come Back to Me - 1970
I Know - 1970
Only You  - 1970
Please Forgive Me  - 1970
Rain  - 1970
Road to Love  - 1970
To Forget You  - 1970
What Am I Gonna Do - 1970
With My Regrets   - 1970
Yester Me, Yester You, Yesterday - 1970

See also
Donna Cruz
George Canseco

References

Filipino child singers
20th-century Filipino male singers
1958 births
Living people
Vicor Music artists